Boles may refer to:

People
 Boles (surname)

Places in the United States
 Boles, Arkansas
 Boles, California
 Boles, Missouri
 Boles Acres, New Mexico

See also
 Bole (disambiguation)
 Bowls